Hystaspes was the second son of the Persian king Xerxes I. When his father was assassinated by the vizier Artabanus, Hystaspes' younger brother Artaxerxes I ascended the throne. According to Diodorus of Sicily, Hystaspes was satrap of Bactria at the time of his father's death. This claim of Diodorus conflicts with the version of Ctesias that an Artaban (not to be confused with the murderer of Xerxes I) then led a revolt in Bactria, where he was satrap. It is possible that the true rebel was Hystaspes.

Hystaspes was allegedly assassinated by Artaxerxes I.

Bibliography 
 Margaret C. Miller: Athens and Persia in the Fifth Century BC: A Study in Cultural Receptivity. Cambridge University Press, 2004, S. 14.

References 

 R. Schmitt, Artaxerxes I, in Encyclopaedia Iranica.

Satraps of the Achaemenid Empire
5th-century BC Iranian people
Achaemenid dynasty